Tachyusa is a genus of rove beetles in the family Staphylinidae. There are more than 20 described species in Tachyusa.

Species
These 25 species belong to the genus Tachyusa:

 Tachyusa americana Casey, 1906
 Tachyusa americanoides Pasnik, 2006
 Tachyusa arida Casey, 1906
 Tachyusa balteata Erichson, 1839
 Tachyusa brunnea Last, 1966
 Tachyusa cavicollis LeConte, 1863
 Tachyusa coarctata Erichson, 1837
 Tachyusa coarctatoides Pasnik, 2006
 Tachyusa colorata (Fairmaire, 1860)
 Tachyusa concinna Heer, 1839
 Tachyusa constricta Erichson, 1837
 Tachyusa faceta Casey, 1885
 Tachyusa ferialis (Erichson, 1839)
 Tachyusa gracillima LeConte, 1863
 Tachyusa nitella Fauvel, 1895
 Tachyusa nitidula Mulsant & Rey, 1875
 Tachyusa objecta Mulsant & Rey, 1870
 Tachyusa obsoleta Casey, 1906
 Tachyusa ornatella Casey, 1906
 Tachyusa prunosa Casey
 Tachyusa scitula Erichson, 1837
 Tachyusa seticornis Sharp, 1883
 Tachyusa smetanai Pasnik, 2006
 Tachyusa sparsa Sharp, 1883
 Tachyusa subalutacea Casey, 1906

References

Further reading

External links

 

Aleocharinae
Articles created by Qbugbot